The Redmi Note 10 is a line of Android-based smartphones as part of the Redmi Note series by Redmi, a sub-brand of Xiaomi Inc. This series were introduced in March 2021 in India and worldwide and May 2021 in China. It succeeds the Redmi Note 9 series of smartphones, which were introduced in 2020.

In some markets Redmi Note 10 5G is marketed as the POCO M3 Pro and Redmi Note 10T 5G. In Russia Redmi Note 10 5G sold as Redmi Note 10T without 5G support. A Redmi Note 10 JE (Japan Edition) was introduced for the Japanese market, and that has similar specifications to the Redmi Note 10 5G but a different processor, battery and the addition of IP68 water resistance. The Japanese Redmi Note 10T has most specifications as Redmi Note 10 JE but with other camera, design, battery capacity as Note 10 5G and eSIM support. On May 24, 2022 Xiaomi introduced Redmi Note 11SE which have same specs as Chinese Redmi Note 10 5G but design from POCO M3 Pro.

In the global market Redmi Note 10 Pro 5G is marketed as the POCO X3 GT.

In 2022 Redmi Note 10S was reintroduced in India as Redmi Note 11 SE (not to be confused with Chinese Redmi Note 11SE) and as Poco M5s on global market. Redmi Note 11 SE do not have in-box charger and Poco M5s has slightly different.

Specifications 
Xiaomi Redmi Note 10 is not something groundbreaking. However, the available features, besides its handsome design and its cost-effectiveness, are the realities you can’t neglect. It gives you all the pleasures that top-branded phones can give, but astonishingly, at a very low price, about equivalent to their one-third even.

It gives you a standard smart view and a much decent design. The phone has a lightweight of 188.8g, which makes it easy to hold and use single-handedly. Its thickness and curved plastic back with smooth finish make its grip tight and highly attractive.

Design and Build 
The phone is available in three decent colors; Shadow Black (Onyx Gray), Frost White (Pebble White) and Aqua Green (Lake Green). It has a plastic back and Corning Gorilla Glass 3-protected front with rounded edges and a curved body.

Talking about the phone’s dimensions, its height is 160.46 mm, width is 74.5 mm, and thickness is 8.29 mm. As mentioned earlier, its overall weight is 188.8 grams. We can easily find that its dimensions are at better parity with other competitors in the market.

Display 
Xiaomi Redmi Note 10 has an AMOLED Dot-Display panel with a resolution of 1080 x 2400 Pixel. It has a screen size of 6.43 inches. Moreover, the Brightness of the phone is 700 nits, extendable up to 1100 nits maximally, which is pretty high. Furthermore, it has a Pixel Density of 409 PPI, while the contrast ratio is about 4,500,000:1. Additionally, The screen-to-body ratio is around 83.5%.

The phone has 16 million 8-bit display colors and an HD+ resolution. This type of display can usually be found in flagship phones. Moreover, the refresh rate is 60Hz which should have been higher, as almost all the mid-range phones contain a 90Hz refresh rate.

Other fascinating features related to display include the DCI-P3 color gamut; an up-to-date variant, that provides a sufficient amount of color combinations in case of motion pictures display. Besides, it has a 3.0 reading mode and a sunlight display of 2.0, which helps protect the eyes while reading and using the display during sunlight.

Performance 
The phone has 4GB and 6GB RAM variants. The RAM of all variants is of type LPDDR4X, which is faster and more efficient than the DDR type RAMs. Furthermore, the phone runs on Android 11 and MIUI 12 custom user interface based on Android R.

Coming towards the phone’s hardware, it has users’ all-time favorite Qualcomm Snapdragon 678 chipset, coupled with Qualcomm Adreno 612 GPU, ensuring the smooth performance of the phone. Moreover, it has a 64-bit architecture and an AnTuTu score of 238,519. This AnTuTu score is very good compared to other phones of the same category.

Rear Camera 
This phone is equipped with a rear quad camera setup. Redmi Note 10 is one of the few phones which provide a quad camera at this price in Bangladesh. The quad camera consists of a 48MP wide-angle camera, 8MP ultra-wide camera, 2MP macro sensor and a 2MP depth sensor. The rear camera provides an image resolution of 8000 x 6000 pixels. Moreover, it can record 4k videos as well.

Front Camera 
Xiaomi has provided a single 13MP front camera in the Redmi Note 10. It provides an image resolution of 4128 x 3096 pixels and has an aperture of f/2.45, covering a large area. Some notable photography features of this camera include Timed burst, AI Beautify, AI portrait mode with bokeh and depth control, Face detection and HDR. Moreover, the front camera can record HD videos as well.

References

External links

 

Redmi smartphones
Mobile phones introduced in 2021
Mobile phones with multiple rear cameras
Mobile phones with 4K video recording
Mobile phones with infrared transmitter